Zawadów may refer to:

Zawadów, Łódź Voivodeship
Zawadów, Lublin Voivodeship
 Polish name of Ukrainian locations named Zavadiv

pl:Zawadów